Anado may refer to:

Anado McLauchlin (b. 1947), an artist living in Mexico
, a US Navy patrol vessel in commission from 1917 to 1919